Gigi Fernández and Natalia Zvereva were the defending champions and beat Inés Gorrochategui and Helena Suková, 6–7, 6–4, 6–3, in the final to retain the title.

Seeds
Champion seeds are indicated in bold text while text in italics indicates the round in which those seeds were eliminated. The top four seeded teams received byes into the second round.

Draw

Final

Top half

Bottom half

External links
 1994 Volkswagen Cup Doubles draw

Doubles
Doubles 1994